John Howard Mueller (June 13, 1891, Sheffield, Massachusetts – February 14, 1954) was an American biochemist, pathologist, and bacteriologist. He is known as the discoverer of the amino acid methionine in 1921, and as the co-developer, with Jane Hinton, of the eponymous Mueller–Hinton agar.

Biography
J. Howard Mueller was the son of a Unitarian clergyman and grew up in Illinois. He studied biology at Illinois Wesleyan University with a bachelor's degree in 1912. He was then a chemistry instructor at the University of Louisville for two years before receiving his master's degree in 1914. He became interested in pathology and bacteriology and in 1914 attended a summer course at the Medical Faculty of Columbia University. He stayed there for further studies after receiving a scholarship and received in 1916 his doctorate Ph.D. in pathology. He then became an assistant pathologist at the New York Presbyterian Hospital. In 1917 he was a volunteer at the front in France with a medical unit and was involved in empirical proof of the transmission of trench fever by lice. In 1919 he was discharged as a lieutenant and became an instructor in bacteriology under Hans Zinsser at Columbia University. (The academic position to which Mueller was appointed was formerly held by J. Gardner Hopkins, who was promoted.) At Columbia, Mueller did research on the requirements for the growth of cultures of pathogenic bacteria. He wrote:

He was the first to succeed in isolating and characterizing methionine, which certain streptococci needed for their growth. In 1923 when Zinnser was appointed as the chair of the department of bacteriology and immunology at Harvard Medical School, Mueller followed him and became an assistant professor there. However, Mueller had to interrupt his work on bacterial metabolism, including work on Rous sarcoma virus with a dispute over William Ewart Gye's theory. In 1930 Mueller began his studies on the nutritional requirements of the diphtheria bacillus.

His work with the diphtheria pathogen was also of practical importance for the development of vaccines against diphtheria (by optimizing the bacterial cultures). From the early 1940s, he turned to research om the tetanus pathogen. After Zinsser's death in 1940, Mueller became head of the bacteriology department at Harvard. He continued to do research. Ge arrived several hours early at his laboratory and experimented until his co-workers arrived in the morning, then gave the research to his assistant Pauline Miller so that could devoted himself to administrative work. In addition to basic research, he always aimed at medical applications to fight infectious agents.

In 1944 when Oswald Avery, Colin MacLeod and Maclyn McCarty published their research on bacterial DNA, Mueller understood the meaning and importance of their results and published his viewpoint in 1945 in a review article.

Mueller was elected a fellow of the American Academy of Arts and Sciences in 1928 and a member of the National Academy of Sciences in 1945.

Selected publications
 
 
 
 
 
 
  (See Harvey Society.)

References

American biochemists
American pathologists
American bacteriologists
Illinois Wesleyan University alumni
University of Louisville alumni
Columbia University alumni
Harvard Medical School faculty
Fellows of the American Academy of Arts and Sciences
Members of the United States National Academy of Sciences
1891 births
1954 deaths
People from Sheffield, Massachusetts
Scientists from Massachusetts